AICC may refer to:

 AICc, a version of Akaike information criterion (AIC, which is used in statistics), that has a correction for small sample sizes
 All India Congress Committee, the central presidium of the Congress Party
 All India Christian Council, an alliance of Christian denominations, mission agencies, institutions, federations and Christian lay leaders in India.
 Adiabatic Isochoric Complete Combustion
 Arusha International Conference Centre, the leading conference venue in Tanzania
 Aviation Industry Computer-Based Training Committee, an e-Learning group and a tracking specification
 Aviation Industry Corporation of China, a Chinese state-owned aerospace and defense company
 Accident Investigation Coordination Committee, subordinate to the Ministry of Civil Aviation and Communication Maldives
 Arctic Icebreaker Coordinating Committee, a subcommittee of the University-National Oceanographic Laboratory System responsible for managing the US Research Icebreaker fleet
 Association for Inherited Cardiac Conditions, a UK-based association of Geneticists and Cardiologists with expertise in inherited disease